Bill Fitzgerald is a television news anchor and reporter. He anchors evening newscasts for WTVR in Richmond, VA and is a former MSNBC overnight anchor. He was also the news anchor for WNCN (NBC-17) with co-anchor Melanie Sanders and meteorologist Wes Hohenstein weeknights at 6, 7 and 11 pm. He was released from WNCN in December 2008, almost 2 years after joining, due to economic downsizing by parent company Media General.

Prior to joining WNCN, Fitzgerald was an anchor for MSNBC. Prior to joining MSNBC, Fitzgerald served as weekend anchor and general assignment reporter for the NBC owned-and-operated station WVTM-TV in Birmingham, Alabama. 
He previously served as reporter for the local cable news network News 12 Long Island, New York. He was also an off-air reporter and associate 
producer for the NBC owned-and-operated WVIT-TV in Hartford, Connecticut. Before starting his television career, Fitzgerald taught junior high and high school level English in Rome, Italy and at Eton College in Great Britain.

History
Fitzgerald graduated cum laude from Harvard University with a Bachelor of Arts in English. He also holds a Master's Degree in journalism from Columbia University. He and his wife have three children.

References 

Year of birth missing (living people)
Harvard College alumni
Columbia University Graduate School of Journalism alumni
Living people
American television news anchors